Aldershot GO Station is a railway station and bus station used by Via Rail and GO Transit, located at Highway 403 and Waterdown Road in the Aldershot community of Burlington, Ontario, Canada.

Services
Aldershot serves Burlington on Via Rail's Quebec City–Windsor Corridor routes between Toronto and Windsor, and is also served by trains coming westbound from Montreal. It doubles as the Via Rail station for Hamilton, which does not have an intercity rail station of its own.

The station is also served by the joint Via–Amtrak Maple Leaf train, connecting Toronto and New York City through Niagara Falls.

Aldershot is the western terminus of 30-minute service on the Lakeshore West line in off-peak hours, with every second train continuing on to West Harbour GO Station and with bus connections available to Hamilton GO Centre and Brantford Bus Terminal. Four trains continue on to Hamilton GO during peak periods. One peak-hour train arrives from Niagara Falls in the morning and continues to Niagara Falls in the afternoon.

Burlington Transit bus routes 4 Central and 87 North Service – Aldershot terminate at this station. Hamilton Street Railway bus route 18 Waterdown provides peak hour, weekday service to Waterdown.

History

The Great Western Railway built the first railway station built here, a wooden structure consisting of ticket office, waiting room and freight room. It was originally named Waterdown Station, due to its location on Waterdown Road. The Great Western was purchased in 1882 by the Grand Trunk Railway, which replaced the station in the early 1900s. In 1912, the Canadian Pacific Railway constructed a rail line from Guelph Junction to Hamilton and built a station in the neighbouring town of Waterdown with the GTR station subsequently renamed after the community of Aldershot, where it is situated. In 1920, the GTR merged into the Canadian National Railway. By the 1950s, passenger travel declined. The station closed in 1978, and was demolished in the 1980s. GO Transit built the current station in 1992.

In November 2021, the southern-most track at the station was a stub siding with a side platform facing east. Metrolinx had CN (the owner of the railway right-of-way west of Burlington GO station) extend this siding  westwards to connect with the Lakeshore West mainline. This extension will allow more frequent service to West Harbour GO, St. Catharines GO, and Niagara Falls GO stations. Work on the extension started in November 2021 and was completed by June 2022.

References

External links

Aldershot Via Rail & GO Transit Station (Canada RailGuide—TrainWeb)

Via Rail stations in Ontario
GO Transit railway stations
Amtrak stations in Canada
Railway stations in Burlington, Ontario
Railway stations in Canada opened in 1992
1992 establishments in Ontario